The Fokker D.XXIII was a Dutch single-seat fighter designed and built by Fokker. Only one aircraft was flown before the country was invaded by the Germans in May 1940.

Development
The Fokker D.XXIII was designed as a twin-engined single-seat aircraft. To overcome the problems of asymmetric flight it had a tractor engine at the front and a pusher engine at the rear. The D.XXIII was a cantilever monoplane with the twin tail units on booms. The pilot had an enclosed cockpit in between the tractor and pusher engines and it had a retractable tricycle landing gear.

The prototype first flew on 30 May 1939 powered by two Walter Sagitta I-SR air cooled vee piston engines. The trial flights identified problems with the cooling of the rear engine and general engine performance. It was proposed to use Rolls-Royce or Daimler-Benz engines in the production aircraft. Concerns were also raised about the pilot clearing the rear propeller if he had to bail out and an ejector seat was studied. As a provisional solution, rails were put on both sides of the forward fuselage for the Fokker test pilot, Gerben Sonderman, to use to bail out in an emergency. The aircraft was flown 11 times for a total flight time of less than four hours. The rear fuselage paneling was modified significantly before the last few flights in an attempt to address chronic rear engine cooling problems. On the 11th flight in April, the undercarriage was damaged, and the programme was abandoned in May 1940 when the German forces invaded the Netherlands.

Specifications

See also

References

Citations

Bibliography

External links

D 23
1930s Dutch fighter aircraft
Twin-engined push-pull aircraft
Low-wing aircraft
Twin-boom aircraft
Aircraft first flown in 1939
Twin-engined piston aircraft